St. Matthew's University (SMU) is a private for-profit offshore medical school located in Grand Cayman, Cayman Islands in the Caribbean. SMU has a School of Medicine and a School of Veterinary Medicine, which confer M.D. and D.V.M. degrees, respectively. St. Matthew's University is owned by R3 Education, Inc.

History

SMU was founded in Belize in 1997 by Dr. Michael Harris and other medical doctors. In 2001, the board of directors changed the university's administration. In 2002, the school moved to the Cayman Islands under interim president Dr. B. D. Owens.  Dr. Michael Harris was named president in 2003 and the Medical University gained full accreditation.

The School of Veterinary Medicine was established in 2005 under the direction of Dr. Scott Harris, DVM . The school was acquired by Greenwich, Connecticut-based Equinox Capital in conjunction with Chicago-based Prairie Capital in 2005.

Accreditation and recognition

School of Medicine
SMU is chartered by the government of the Cayman Islands. and is accredited by the Accreditation Commission of Colleges of Medicine, an accrediting agency listed in the FAIMER Directory of Organizations that Recognize/Accredit Medical Schools (DORA). The School of Medicine has been accredited since 2001 with accreditation extending until June 30, 2025. Since 2002 the United States Department of Education's National Committee on Foreign Medical Education and Accreditation (NCFMEA) has recognized SMU's accreditor as using standards that are comparable to the standards used to accredit medical schools in the United States.

St. Matthew's University School of Medicine is approved by the New York State Education Department (NYSED) to allow students to complete more than 12 weeks of clinical clerkships in New York State. SMU is one of eight Caribbean medical schools so approved by NYSED.

St. Matthew's University School of Medicine is licensed by the Florida Department of Education's Commission for Independent Education (CIE) for the purpose of providing clinical rotations in Florida. SMU is one of only seven Caribbean medical schools so approved by the CIE (St. George's University School of Medicine, Ross University School of Medicine, American University of the Caribbean School of Medicine, Saba University School of Medicine, American University of Antigua College of Medicine, Universidad Iberoamericana (UNIBE) School of Medicine, Medical University of the Americas).

The University is listed in the World Directory of Medical Schools.

SMU School of Medicine who are either American citizens or permanent residents can participate on the Federal Direct Student Loan Program.

Medical School curriculum
The MD program at SMU is a ten-semester course of study that consists of three semesters per calendar year.  Semesters 1-5 are basic science semesters that are completed at the university's Grand Cayman (Cayman Islands) campus.  Semesters 6-10 consist of 72 weeks of clinical training at rural hospitals in United States, Canada, or the United Kingdom.

Licensure restrictions
In the United States, the medical boards of the following states restrict St. Matthew's University graduates from obtaining licensure::

Indiana
 Kansas

In the United Kingdom, the General Medical Council has listed St. Matthew's University as an institution whose graduates from the Belize campus (closed in 2002) are ineligible for licensure. Graduates from the current Cayman Islands campus are eligible for licensure.

Residence Hall 
The Residence Hall is a two-story former tourist hotel building in the luxurious  beach area that has been repurposed to create a living learning atmosphere geared toward students’ academic success. New students arriving on the island live in the St. Matthew's University Residence Hall for at least one semester and are welcome to stay as many semesters as they like. The rent for a small room is $4,245–4,800 (USD) for almost 4 months with high-speed internet provided.

School of Veterinary Medicine
St. Matthew's University School of Veterinary Medicine (SMUSVM) is listed by the American Veterinary Medical Association, and its graduates qualify for entrance into the Educational Commission for Foreign Veterinary Graduates (ECFVG) or the Program for the Assessment of Veterinary Education Equivalence (PAVE) certification programs.

The PAVE program is a foreign licensing program that allows students to qualify to take the North American Veterinary Licensing Examination (NAVLE). The PAVE qualifying exam is written or online and intended to test the knowledge of students in foreign veterinary schools.  It covers material learned  in the first three (pre-clinical) years of AVMA-accredited veterinary schools. The PAVE program is recognized in 39 states currently, as well as Australia and New Zealand.

The ECFVG is a program that assesses the overall knowledge of veterinary students from non-AVMA-accredited schools to ensure they have sufficient knowledge to practice veterinary medicine within the United States. The program contains four steps and is recognized by all 50 states to allow those that receive a certificate the ability to practice within those states.

Students at the School of Veterinary Medicine complete their pre-clinical education in 28 months (7 semesters), with three more semesters (12 months) completed in either the United States or Canada as the clinical year. The incoming class size is limited to 35 students and the faculty to student ratio is 1:5.

The  requirements for applying to St. Matthew's University School of Veterinary Medicine are: 8 credits (and lab) of General Biology and General Chemistry, 4 credits (and lab) of Organic Chemistry, 3 credits of Biochemistry, 6 credits of Language Arts (English), 3 credits of College Math or Computer Science, 4 credits of Physics (Recommended), and 6 credits of Social Science (Recommended).

There is a concurrent dual degree program available for students to receive their Master of Business Administration degree from Davenport University, which is offered completely online. Members of the dual degree program receive benefits that include qualification for Title IV federal student aid (for U.S. citizens and eligible non-citizens), receiving partnership tuition rates for the entire program, advancing the student's career with two degrees as a doctor of veterinary medicine and an MBA, and the ability to apply up to 15 transferable graduate credits.

SMUSVM has clinical year programs with Purdue University, University of Pennsylvania, University of Minnesota, North Carolina State University, Oklahoma State University, and University of Illinois.

Notable alumni
 Kehinde Aladefa, Nigerian Olympic athlete
 Daaron McField, former Canadian Football League player

See also
 Medical School
 International medical graduate
 List of medical schools in the Caribbean

References

External links
 St. Matthew's University Grand Cayman Island Official University Web Site

 
For-profit universities and colleges in North America
Medical schools in the Cayman Islands
Health in the Cayman Islands
Educational institutions established in 1997
1997 establishments in Belize
2002 establishments in the Cayman Islands
Universities in the Cayman Islands
Buildings and structures in George Town, Cayman Islands